Denis Duchosal (born 16 August 1971) is a retired Swiss football midfielder.

References

1971 births
Living people
Swiss men's footballers
Swiss Super League players
Servette FC players
CS Chênois players
Étoile Carouge FC players
FC Meyrin players
Association football midfielders